Newsbooks were the 17th-century precursors to today's newspapers.
Originating in England and Scotland, they are distinct from the earlier news periodicals, known as corantos, which were sourced from Europe.

History
The first newsbook was published in November 1641, and in the years 1641-2 there were 171 different editions available. The newsbooks were strongly partisan until Parliament regained control of the press in September 1649. 

Newsbooks often contained satirical poems, or otherwise formal reports of major news events.

See also
Gilbert Mabbot

References
4. NEWSBOOK : Most viewed news website by youth.
 

Newspapers published in England
1641 establishments in England
Newspapers published in Scotland
1641 establishments in Scotland